Patrick Kennedy (born 26 August 1977) is an English actor and director.

He studied English literature and language at St John's College, Oxford, and then attended LAMDA.

Kennedy's first screen role was in Peter Greenaway's The Tulse Luper Suitcases, followed by the role of Julian Bell in the BBC's Cambridge Spies.

Kennedy's first lead role was playing Richard Carstone in the BBC adaptation of Charles Dickens' Bleak House, and he followed this with roles in Joe Wright's Atonement, Steven Spielberg's Munich, Richard Linklater's Me and Orson Welles, and Michael Hoffman's The Last Station.

Kennedy recurred on the television series Boardwalk Empire in 2012, earning a nomination for Screen Actors Guild Award for Outstanding Performance by an Ensemble in a Drama Series, and played the role of McKechnie in Parade's End, directed by Susanna White, written by Tom Stoppard.

Kennedy's recent television roles have included Neil in Peep Show (Season 8), the lead role in ITV's Murder on the Home Front, a lead opposite Brendan Gleeson in the HBO pilot The Money, Sampson in ITV's Downton Abbey, Jock Colville with Michael Gambon in Churchill's Secret, directed by Charles Sturridge, and recurring roles in Hulu's The First, Mrs Wilson for the BBC, and Allston Wheatley in Scott Frank's The Queen's Gambit for Netflix.

Kennedy’s more recent film roles include Lieutenant Waverly in Steven Spielberg's War Horse, Roger Donaldson's November Man, Bill Condon's Mr Holmes (with Ian McKellen), Babak Najafi's London Has Fallen, Lt. Col. Guy L'Estrange in Mike Leigh's Peterloo; Edward Aveling opposite Romola Garai in Susanna Nicchiarelli's Miss Marx.

Kennedy's stage roles include Lysander in A Midsummer Night's Dream at the Bristol Old Vic (directed by David Farr); George Holly in Michael Grandage's production of Suddenly Last Summer with Diana Rigg and Victoria Hamilton in the West End; the lead role of Jonathan in Everything is Illuminated at The Hampstead Theatre; Camille in Therese Raquin, at the National Theatre, directed by Marianne Elliott; Tom in The Glass Menagerie, for Shared Experience; Oliver in Polly Stenham's No Quarter, directed by Jeremy Herrin at the Royal Court; Don Caspar in Anna Ziegler's Photograph 51, with Nicole Kidman, directed by Michael Grandage at the Noel Coward Theatre.

In 2017 Kennedy took the lead roles in Harold Pinter's The Lover and The Collection, directed by Michael Kahn for the Shakespeare Theatre Company, Lansburgh Theatre, Washington D.C.

Kennedy has worked on several films with the British artist Nathaniel Mellors, playing the recurring Neanderthal character Voggen Williams in The Sophisticated Neanderthal Interview, Neanderthal Container, and the pub lecher, Uncle Tommy, in the Ourhouse series

In 2018 Kennedy wrote and directed the short film The Human Voice, starring Rosamund Pike, adapted from the Jean Cocteau play La Voix Humaine.

Kennedy portrayed astronaut Michael Collins in the documentary of the Apollo 11 mission, 8 Days: To the Moon and Back, shown on BBC2 on 10 July 2019.

Filmography

Theatre

External links
Curtis Brown CV 

BBC Profile
Deadline-Patrick Kennedy cast as lead in HBO Pilot
Hollywood Reporter- HBO's the Money casts Patrick Kennedy
My Friendship with Luise Rainer 

1977 births
Living people
English male film actors
English male television actors
Male actors from London